Moscow Nights (French: Les nuits moscovites) is a 1934 French war drama film directed by Alexis Granowsky and starring Annabella, Harry Baur and Pierre Richard-Willm.

It is based on a story by Pierre Benoît. The film's sets were designed by the art director Andrej Andrejew. It marked the screen debut of the Corsican singer Tino Rossi who went on to star in a number of films.

The following year a separate British version Moscow Nights was produced by London Films. Directed by Anthony Asquith the only actor to appear in both films was Harry Baur.

Synopsis
In Moscow during the First World War the attractive Natacha Kovrine agrees to marry a wealthy grain merchant under pressure from her mother. However, while working as a nurse in a hospital she meets the wounded Captain Ignatoff and falls in love with him. When he is arrested and false accused of treason, it appears that the only man who might be able to save him is her fiancée.

Cast
 Annabella as Natacha Kovrine
 Harry Baur as Piotr Brioukow
 Pierre Richard-Willm as Le capitaine Ignatoff
 Germaine Dermoz as Madame Kovrine
 Roger Karl as Le colonel Kovrine
 Spinelly as Anna Sabline
 Ernest Ferny as Le capitaine Polonsky
 Jean Toulout as Le chef d'état-major
 Paul Escoffier as Le général Molochof
 Paul Amiot as Le président de la cour martiale 
 Tino Rossi as Le chanteur napolitain
 Mario Podesta as Le tzigane
 Daniel Mendaille as Un diplomate
 Youcca Troubetzkov as Le capitaine Alev
 Edmond Van Daële as Le mendiant
 Robert Seller as Fédor

References

Bibliography 
 Oscherwitz, Dayna & Higgins, MaryEllen. The A to Z of French Cinema. Scarecrow Press, 2009.

External links 
 

1934 films
1930s war drama films
French war drama films
1930s French-language films
Films directed by Alexis Granowsky
Films set in Moscow
Films set in 1916
French World War I films
Films based on works by Pierre Benoit
1930s French films